The Roy Orbison/The Beatles Tour was a 1963 concert tour of the United Kingdom by Roy Orbison and the Beatles. Other acts on the tour included Gerry and the Pacemakers, David MacBeth, Louise Cordet, Tony Marsh, Terry Young Six, Erkey Grant, and Ian Crawford. It was Orbison's first, and the Beatles' third nationwide tour of the UK. Although Orbison was originally intended to be the headlining act, the reaction to the Beatles on the tour caused them to be promoted to co-headliners, with the Beatles closing the set in the traditional headlining spot.

In 1988, Orbison and Beatle George Harrison would be reunited in the supergroup The Traveling Wilburys.

Setlists

The Beatles
The Beatles' typical setlist (showing lead vocalist) was:
"Some Other Guy" (John Lennon)
"Do You Want to Know a Secret?" (George Harrison)
"Love Me Do" or "A Taste Of Honey" (Paul McCartney)
"From Me To You" (John Lennon)
"Please Please Me" (John Lennon)
"I Saw Her Standing There" (Paul McCartney)
"Twist and Shout" (John Lennon) or "Long Tall Sally" (Paul McCartney)

Roy Orbison 
Roy Orbison's typical setlist was:

 Only The Lonely
 Candy Man
 Running Scared
 What'd I Say (Ray Charles)
 Dream Baby (How Long Must I Dream)
 In Dreams

Tour dates

Tour band
 Roy Orbison – vocals, guitar
 Rodney Justo – background vocals
 Dean "Ox" Daughtry – keyboards
 John Raney Adkins – guitar
 Paul Garrison – drums

Orbison was given two amplifiers by Jim Marshall – the first two Marshall's to come into America.

The Beatles
 John Lennon – vocals, rhythm guitar, acoustic guitar, harmonica
 Paul McCartney – vocals, bass guitar
 George Harrison – vocals, lead guitar, acoustic guitar
 Ringo Starr – drums

The Beatles' instruments and equipment
Lennon      
 1958 Rickenbacker 325 Electric Guitar
 1962 Gibson J-160E Acoustic-Electric Guitar 
 Vox AC-30 Amplifier
McCartney
 1961 Höfner 500/1 Violin Hollowbody Bass Guitar
 Vox Bass Cabinet
Harrison     
 1963 Gretsch Country Gentleman Hollowbody Electric Guitar
 1961 Gretsch Duo Jet Solidbody Electric Guitar 
 Vox AC-30 Amplifier
Starr          
 1962 Ludwig Pearl Drumkit

See also
 List of the Beatles' live performances

References

External links
 Official Roy Orbison website article

1963 concert tours
Roy Orbison Tour
1963 in the United Kingdom
Concert tours of the United Kingdom
Roy Orbison
Co-headlining concert tours
May 1963 events in the United Kingdom
June 1963 events in the United Kingdom